River Wangki in Miskitu or Río Coco, in Spanish, formerly known as the Río Segovia, Cape River, or Yara River, is a river located on the border of northern Nicaragua and southern Honduras.

The river originates in the Somoto Canyon National Monument, near where the Pan American Highway crosses into Nicaragua, and flows through low mountainous terrain  into the Caribbean Sea at Cabo Gracias a Dios; the middle and lower reaches form the Honduras-Nicaragua border.

Location

See also
Honduras–Nicaragua border
List of rivers of the Americas

References

Coco
Coco
International rivers of North America
Honduras–Nicaragua border
Border rivers